Greenfield Center is a hamlet in Saratoga County, New York, United States. Greenfield Center has a post office with ZIP code 12833, which opened on February 16, 1831.

Greenfield Center was formed in 1793 and has grown to a population of approximately 7,400.

References

Greenfield Center Historical Society

Hamlets in Saratoga County, New York
Hamlets in New York (state)